Calyptomena is a genus of birds in the family Calyptomenidae. The name is a combination of two Greek words: kaluptos meaning "covered", and mēnē, meaning "moon". Established by Thomas Stamford Raffles in 1822, the genus contains three species:

Species

All three species are primarily green, and all are found in Borneo. The larger two species, Hose's and Whitehead's, are endemic to the island, while the smaller green broadbill is also found in Sumatra and on the Malay peninsula.

References

 
Bird genera
Taxa named by Thomas Stamford Raffles